Skui may refer to:

 Børre Skui (born 1958), Norwegian sailor
 El Caraño Airport, Colombia (ICAO code SKUI)
 Skui, Norway